Shanty Run is a tributary of Quinn Run in Sullivan County, Pennsylvania, in the United States. The stream is acidic and is considered by the Pennsylvania Department of Environmental Protection to be impaired by atmospheric deposition. Rock formations in the watershed include the Huntley Mountain Formation and the Burgoon Sandstone. Soils in the watershed include the Deep-Wellsboro-Oquaga, Oquaga, and Norwich soil associations.

Course
Shanty Run begins in Davidson Township. It flows east for a short distance before turning south. It then turns south-southwest and enters a steep valley. At the end of the valley, the stream reaches its confluence with Quinn Run.

Tributaries
Shanty Run has an unnamed tributary known as Unt 28004.

Hydrology
The discharge of Shanty Run is 472 gallons per minute during average flow conditions. The stream's pH during average flow conditions is 5.76 and the concentration of aluminum is 0.107 milligrams per liter. The pH ranges from considerably less than 5 to nearly 7.

Shanty Run experiences episodic acidification. The water quality of the stream is considered to be "fair" during average flow conditions and "very poor" during high flow conditions. Proposed methods of increasing the stream's alkalinity include forest surface liming and road liming.

Geography and geology

The lower reaches of Shanty Run are on rock of the Huntley Mountain Formation. The upper reaches are on Burgoon Sandstone. Some rock outcroppings are present near the stream.

Shanty Run flows over soil of the Deep-Wellsboro-Oquaga association in its lower reaches. In its upper reaches, it flows over soil of the Oquaga soil association and the Norris soil association. All of the soils in the watershed are strongly acidic.

Watershed
It is entirely within Pennsylvania State Game Lands.

Part of Shanty Run is accessible by road.

History
The restoration of Shanty Run is part of the second phase of the East Branch Fishing Creek Restoration Plan. This phase, which also includes Quinn Run, is estimated to cost $300,000.

Shanty Run and its unnamed tributary were first listed by the Pennsylvania Department of Environmental Protection as impaired in 2002. As of December 2011, the total maximum daily load date for the stream is 2015.

See also
List of tributaries of Fishing Creek (North Branch Susquehanna River)

References

Rivers of Sullivan County, Pennsylvania
Tributaries of Fishing Creek (North Branch Susquehanna River)
Rivers of Pennsylvania